Ruslan Kurbanov or Qurbanov may refer to:

 Ruslan Kurbanov (activist) (born 1976), Russian activist
 Ruslan Kurbanov (fencer) (born 1991), Kazakhstani fencer
 Ruslan Kurbanov (triple jumper) (born 1993), Uzbekistani triple jumper
 Ruslan Qurbanov (born 1991), Russian football player